Ann Moore created the hands-free baby carrier called the Snugli and the refined version of it called the Weego.

Early life and education
Ann Moore was born in Ohio in 1940 and grew up in a farming community known as the Dunkard Brethren Church that valued simplicity and the ability to problem solve. In her young adult life she worked in international camps in Morocco and Germany. When she was an undergraduate she attended the University of Cincinnati to study pediatric nursing, and then went on to teach it at Columbia University’s Babies Hospital in New York City. In 1962 when the chief residents were organizing a Peace Corps team to go on a two year trip to Togo, they recruited Moore as a pediatric nurse on the medical team and she attended the training at Howard University in Washington D.C. where she met her husband Mike Moore.

Career
While Moore was in Africa, she noticed that the babies from Togo cried much less than babies from America. She realized that this was because of the way they were being treated. In America, babies were placed in hard, plastic seats that lacked human warmth. On the other hand, the babies from Togo were carried in fabric slings on their mothers in order to comfort the baby. The babies were always carried, could easily breastfeed, be a part of the moving world, and still allow the mother to function. Moore was inspired by this lifestyle, and when she was pregnant when she returned from the Peace Corps in 1964, she aimed to have the same relationship Togolese mothers had with their children. She achieved this by recruiting her mother, Lucy Aukerman, to help her sew a fabric pouch to carry her baby in. Other mothers who saw the invention became interested and also wanted their own pouch, causing the invention to become popular through word of mouth, eventually reaching the Wall Street Journal. Moore patented what became known as the Snugli in 1969 and operated the Snugli business with her husband. Although the Snugli was originally produced by Moore’s mother and her seamstress friends, the company grew so large that the Moores decided to sell it in 1985 to Gerico.

Inventions
Moore is well known for inventing the Snugli, but she has also created other products. After she sold Snugli in 1985, she was approached by a respiratory therapist and asked if she could make a portable oxygen tank. Moore then created Air Lift, which is a backpack with soft sided carriers that holds oxygen canisters and high tech equipment, and patented it in 1989. The Moores noticed that the company they sold Snugli to had simplified the design in order to spend less money producing the product, so in1999 they released a newer version of the baby carrier known as the Weego. Instead of requiring a seam ripper to rip out the pin tucks and darts as the baby got older, the Weego featured adjustable straps for parents who didn’t know how to sew. She also helps develop other medical products such as carrying cases. Moore’s invention is now a huge part of American culture, and many parents utilize fabric pouches like the Weego to carry their babies and provide them with human warmth.

Impact on society
When Ann Moore created the Snugli, she did not expect to have such a strong impact on the way parents bond with their babies. She also didn't expect to become one of the most significant inventors the world has seen. Yet the original hands-free soft baby carrier she created in the mid-'60s was able to meet both of these marks. Moore's design has received the honor of permanent placement in the Smithsonian Institute and was also recognized by the Wall Street Journal as one of the most significant inventions of the 20th century.

References 

 

1940 births
Living people
20th-century American inventors